En Vivo – Gira 2004–2005 is a documentary of the live concert and history by Chilean band Kudai, released by Warner Bros. Records. It was released on 13 December 2005 in Chile. The DVD includes all music videos from their debut album Vuelo, a documentary and a bonus CD containing previously unreleased material and the live concert of their tour.

Track listing
Disc 1 (Live)
 "En Concierto 
 "No Quiero Regresar" 
 "Que Aquí, Que Allá"
 "Vuelo"
 "Dulce y Violento"
 "Más"
 "Escapar" 
 "Acústico" (Acoustic)
 "Lejos De La Ciudad" 
 "Ya Nada Queda" (It's Over)
 "Quiero" 

Disc 2
 Making of "Sin Despertar"
 Video Clip "Sin Despertar"
 Making of "Ya nada queda"
 Video Clip "Ya nada queda"
 Making of "Escapar"
 Video Clip "Escapar"
 Extras
 Historia
 Remix "Ya Nada Queda"

Charts

Kudai video albums
2005 video albums
Live video albums
2005 live albums